Nicolò Teneggi (born 7 November 2002) is an Italian professional rugby union player who primarily plays fly-half for Zebre Parma of the United Rugby Championship. He has also represented Italy at youth level, having previously played for clubs such as Valorugby Emilia.

Professional career 
Growed with Top10 team Valorugby Emilia, Teneggi signed for Zebre Parma in August 2022 ahead of the 2022–23 United Rugby Championship.

In 2021 and 2022, Teneggi was named in Italy U20s squad for annual Six Nations Under 20s Championship. On 10 January 2023, he was named in Italy A squad for a uncapped test against Romania A.

References

External links 

Nicolò Teneggi at All.rugby

Living people
Italian rugby union players
Valorugby Emilia players
Zebre Parma players
Rugby union fly-halves
2002 births
People from Sassuolo